Catherine Mayer (born 24 January 1961) is an American-born British author and journalist, and the co-founder and President of the Women's Equality Party (WE) in the UK.

Early life 
Mayer was born in the US and later became naturalised as British. She moved to Britain as a child when her father, theatre historian David Mayer, came to research a book and later secured tenure at Manchester University, teaching Ben Elton and Rik Mayall. Her mother, Anne Mayer Bird, is prominent within theatre PR.

Mayer attended Manchester High School for Girls, and studied English Literature and European Studies at the University of Sussex (1978–82). One of her sisters is The Young Ones co-writer (with Mayall) Lise Mayer, while another is the theatre agent Cassie Mayer.

Career 
Mayer started her career at The Economist and has worked as a foreign correspondent at the German news weekly Focus.
 Mayer was president of the Foreign Press Association in London from June 2003 until June 2005. She worked at Time from 2004 to April 2015, serving as Time'''s Editor at Large, Europe Editor, London Bureau Chief and Senior Editor. Mayer began legal action against Time in July 2017 on the grounds of age and gender discrimination."Former editor Catherine Mayer sues Time magazine for sex and age discrimination", CBC Radio, 4 September 2017. Her attorney was Dr. Ann Olivarius, a founding member of the Women's Equality Party, which was co-founded by Mayer (see below); Mayer and Olivarius were featured in a 2018 episode of Thomson Reuters Legal UK & Ireland’s podcast series, "The Hearing." Mayer's lawsuit prompted other journalists to seek legal advice about sexual discrimination and ended with an "amicable resolution" in 2018.

In 2011 Mayer wrote Amortality: The Pleasures and Perils of Living Agelessly about the pros and cons of people living longer. Her 2015 biography of Prince Charles, published as, Charles: The Heart of a King, published in the US as Born to Be King, generated worldwide headlines with its claims of dysfunction in the royal courts. Clarence House, which had facilitated access to the Prince, distanced itself from the book. Mayer stood by the content. The book was a Sunday Times Top Ten bestseller.Charles: The Heart of a King  at Penguin Books.

Mayer's non-fiction, Attack of the 50ft. Women, was published in 2017. The book covers the benefits of gender equality and how it is being promoted in various countries, and has been described as "a compelling feminist call to arms". Her memoir Good Grief, which incorporates letters written by her mother and covers the death of both women's husbands and the coronavirus pandemic, was published by HarperCollins in December 2020, with an updated paperback edition scheduled for February 2022.

 Women's Equality Party 
Mayer co-founded the Women's Equality Party with Sandi Toksvig in March 2015 and is its President. The party has core objectives: equal representation, equal pay, equality in and through the media, equal education, equal health, shared opportunities in parenting and caregiving and an end to violence against women; its first policy commitments were launched by the party's first leader, Sophie Walker, at Conway Hall on 20 October 2015. In February 2018 Mayer stated: "The party also welcomed all genders. Everyone is born with a sex, usually, though not always, male or female. Gender is the product of social and cultural factors that can be changed. The very first policy document made clear that WE supported "the right of all to define their sex or gender or to reject gendered divisions as they choose." The party won its first seat in the local elections in May 2019. Mayer stood as the lead candidate for the party in the 2019 European Elections in London.

 Primadonna Festival 
Mayer co-founded the Primadonna Festival in 2019, a festival of ideas, writing, music and comedy at Laffitt's Hall in Pettaugh, Suffolk, aiming to give prominence to women and to new voices.

 Personal life 
Mayer was married to the musician Andy Gill of Gang of Four, from 1999 until his death in February 2020.

Bibliography
Books
 
 
 
 Attack of the 50 Ft. Women: How Gender Equality Can Save The World. London: HQ. 2017. .
 Good grief (with Anne Mayer Bird). London: HarperCollins (2020). ISBN 9780008436100.  

Selected articles
 
 
 "Why I’m suing a global corporation for discrimination – and why I refuse to back down", The Pool, 30 August 2017.
 "It's not a 'witch hunt,' it's sexual harassment and we should call it out," CNN, 2 November 2017.

Video
 
 

References

 External links 
 Official website
 Profile: Catherine Mayer, Time Magazine Catherine Mayer at The Guardian Catherine Mayer at The Telegraph''

Naturalised citizens of the United Kingdom
American emigrants to the United Kingdom
American expatriates in England
British non-fiction writers
Place of birth missing (living people)
Year of birth missing (living people)
British women journalists
Living people
People educated at Manchester High School for Girls
Alumni of the University of Sussex
Women's Equality Party people
1960s births
21st-century British women writers
British political party founders